Yair Isaac Castro Rodríguez (born 10 April 1997) is a Colombian footballer who plays as a midfielder for Cypriot club PO Xylotymbou.

Career statistics

Club

Notes

References

1997 births
Living people
Colombian footballers
Colombian expatriate footballers
Association football midfielders
Cypriot First Division players
Campeonato de Portugal (league) players
Doxa Katokopias FC players
Ethnikos Achna FC players
Leixões S.C. players
C.D. Trofense players
P.O. Xylotymbou players
Colombian expatriate sportspeople in Cyprus
Colombian expatriate sportspeople in Portugal
Expatriate footballers in Cyprus
Expatriate footballers in Portugal
Footballers from Bogotá